Marion DeKalb Van Horn (January 12, 1837 – August 14, 1895) was an American politician who served as the mayor of Denver, Colorado from 1893 to 1895. He died when he fell from a third story window of the Grand Central Hotel of which he was the proprietor.

References

Mayors of Denver
1837 births
1895 deaths
19th-century American politicians